Ivo Molnar (born 29 July 1994) is a Croatian professional footballer who plays as a defender for  club Arzignano.

Club career
A youth product of Rijeka and Inter Milan, Molnar began his professional career in a year long loan with Voghera in the Serie D. He spent his early career with various other Serie D clubs, moving to Olginatese, Pistoiese, Castiglione, Monza, Dro Calcio, and Pro Patria. He helped Pro Patria get promoted into the Serie C. He made his professional debut with Pro Patria in a 2–1 Serie C win over Pistoiese on 16 September 2017. On 26 August 2020, he transferred to Arzignano.

References

External links
 
 
 HNS Profile

1994 births
Living people
Footballers from Rijeka
Association football defenders
Croatian footballers
Croatia youth international footballers
A.S.D. AVC Vogherese 1919 players
U.S.D. Olginatese players
U.S. Pistoiese 1921 players
A.C. Monza players
U.S. Dro players
Aurora Pro Patria 1919 players
F.C. Arzignano Valchiampo players
Serie C players
Serie D players
Croatian expatriate footballers
Expatriate footballers in Italy
Croatian expatriate sportspeople in Italy